The 2011–12 Lokomotiv Yaroslavl season was the franchise's 52nd season of play in professional ice hockey in Russia. It was supposed to be its fourth season in the Kontinental Hockey League (KHL). The season was scheduled to start on 8 September 2011. However, on 7 September, while traveling to their season opener, the team's plane crashed, killing 44 people, including 25 roster players, and 11 members of the team staff. Alexander Galimov survived the initial impact of the crash with severe injuries, but died on 12 September. Another roster player, Maxim Zyuzyakin, did not travel with the team on the plane. As a consequence, the league cancelled the 7 September Opening Cup game between Salavat Yulaev and Atlant already in progress, postponing the opening of the KHL season until 12 September.

The tragedy forced Lokomotiv Yaroslavl to cancel their participation in the 2011–12 KHL season. Instead, the club participated in the 2011–12 season of the Russian Major League (VHL), the second top ice hockey league in Russia after the KHL, starting in December 2011, and was eligible for the VHL playoffs. Also, Lokomotiv Yaroslavl's squad for the 2012–13 KHL season would automatically be qualified for the KHL playoffs that season, and the club could request allowance to use more than six non-Russian players in the KHL squad.

Off-season
Lokomotiv lost in the 2011 KHL Western Conference Finals 4–2 to Atlant. Following this playoff disappointment, eleven players (most notably former NHLers Daniel Tjärnqvist and Alexander Korolyuk) left the team, and nine players were added to the roster for the upcoming 2011–12 KHL season. The players set to make their debut with the team notably included former NHLers Ruslan Salei and Kārlis Skrastiņš. Also set to make their coaching debuts were former NHLers Brad McCrimmon and Igor Korolev.

Pre-season
The team played nine pre-season games, finishing with a 7–2 record, and won their second straight Latvian Railways Cup ( 23–27 August), a pre-season KHL tournament. On 3 September, the players played their final game, at home against Torpedo, winning 5–2. Alexander Galimov, the final victim of the crash, scored the last goal of that game, sealing the win for Lokomotiv with an empty net goal.

Crash

All players and most of the team staff were killed on 7 September 2011 when the Yak-Service Yak-42 that was chartered by the team crashed on takeoff from Tunoshna Airport in Yaroslavl, into the Volga River. Alexander Galimov survived the crash, but died five days later of his injuries. Goalie coach Jorma Valtonen and forward Maxim Zyuzyakin were not on the flight.

Rebuilding the team
It was announced by KHL president Alexander Medvedev that a disaster draft would be conducted to assemble a new team for Lokomotiv Yaroslavl. Every other team in the league would select up to three players for the pool of 40–45 players for Lokomotiv to select in the disaster draft, which selected up to 14 players, as five players were promoted from Lokomotiv's youth team, and forward Maxim Zyuzyakin, who did not travel with the team, formed the core of the roster before the start of the disaster draft. The drafted players will continue to receive salaries from their respective teams. Lokomotiv's former coach Petr Vorobiev was hired as the new head coach. On 10 September, at the team's public memorial service, team president Yuri Yakovlev announced that Lokomotiv would not participate in the 2011–12 KHL season.

Instead, the club participated in the 2011–12 season of the Russian Major League (VHL), the second top ice hockey league in Russia after the KHL. In October 2011, the team announced that its first game in the VHL would take place on 12 December 2011 at home ice. Players between 17 and 22 years old under contract to KHL and VHL teams were made available for Lokomotiv to build a roster.

Schedule and results

Regular season

|- align="center" bgcolor="#CCFFCC"
| 1 || 12 || Neftyanik Almetyevsk || 5–1 || 1–0–0
|- align="center" bgcolor="#CCFFCC"
| 2 || 14 || Ariada-Akpars Volzhsk || 2–0 || 2–0–0
|-  style="text-align:center; background:#fbb;"
| 3 || 20 || @ Molot-Prikamye Perm || 2–3 OT || 2–0–1
|- align="center"  bgcolor="#CCFFCC"
| 4 || 22 || @ Izhstal Izhevsk || 4–1 || 3–0–1
|- style="text-align:center; background:#fbb;"
| 5 || 28 || HC Donbass || 3–4 OT || 3–0–2
|-

|- align="center" bgcolor="#CCFFCC"
| 6 || 6 || Titan Klin || 4–2 || 4–0–2
|-  style="text-align:center; background:#fbb;"
| 7 || 10 || @ Rubin Tyumen || 2–4 || 4–1–2
|-  style="text-align:center; background:#fbb;"
| 8 || 12 || @ Zauralie Kurgan || 1–3 || 4–2–2
|-  style="text-align:center; background:#fbb;"
| 9 || 14 || @ Mechel Chelyabinsk || 3–4 || 4–3–2
|- align="center" bgcolor="#CCFFCC"
| 10 || 16 || @ Yuzhny Ural Orsk || 3–2 || 5–3–2
|- align="center" bgcolor="#CCFFCC"
| 11 || 25 || Lada Togliatti || 3–1 || 6–3–2
|- align="center" bgcolor="#CCFFCC"
| 12 || 27 || Kristall Saratov || 4–0 || 7–3–2
|- style="text-align:center; background:#fbb;"
| 13 || 29 || Dizel Penza || 3–4 SO || 7–3–3
|-

|- align="center" bgcolor="#CCFFCC"
| 14 || 3 || HC Ryazan || 4–0 || 8–3–3
|- align="center" bgcolor="#CCFFCC"
| 15 || 5 || Dynamo Tver || 6–3 || 9–3–3
|- align="center" bgcolor="#CCFFCC"
| 16 || 12 || @ Kazzinc-Torpedo || 4–1 || 10–3–3
|- align="center" bgcolor="#FFBBBB"
| 17 || 14 || @ Ermak Angarsk || 2–4 || 10–4–3
|- align="center" bgcolor="#CCFFCC"
| 18 || 17 || @ Sokol Krasnoyarsk || 3–2 || 11–4–3
|- align="center" bgcolor="#CCFFCC"
| 19 || 22 || HC VMF St. Petersburg || 3–2 || 12–4–3
|- align="center" bgcolor="#CCFFCC"
| 20 || 24 || HC Sarov || 4–0 || 13–4–3
|- align="center" bgcolor="#FFBBBB"
| 21 || 27 || @ Sputnik Nizhny Tagil || 1–2 || 13–5–3
|- align="center" bgcolor="#FFBBBB"
| 22 || 29 || @ Toros Neftekamsk || 2–4 || 13–6–3
|-

Playoffs

|- align="center" bgcolor="#FFBBBB"
| 1 || 6 || HC VMF || 0–2 || 0–1
|- align="center" bgcolor="#CCFFCC"
| 2 || 7 || HC VMF || 4–1 || 1–1
|- align="center" bgcolor="#CCFFCC"
| 3 || 10 || @ HC VMF || 4–3 || 2–1
|- align="center" bgcolor="#FFBBBB"
| 4 || 11 || @ HC VMF || 2–3 (OT) || 2–2
|- align="center" bgcolor="#CCFFCC"
| 5 || 14 || HC VMF || 2–1 || 3–2
|-

|- align="center" bgcolor="#CCFFCC"
| 1 || 18 || @ Dizel Penza || 3–2 (OT) || 1–0
|- align="center" bgcolor="#FFBBBB"
| 2 || 19 || @ Dizel Penza || 2–1 (OT) || 1–1
|- align="center" bgcolor="#CCFFCC"
| 3 || 22 || Dizel Penza || 2–0 || 2–1
|- align="center" bgcolor="#FFBBBB"
| 4 || 23 || Dizel Penza || 1–2 || 2–2
|- align="center" bgcolor="#FFBBBB"
| 5 || 26 || @ Dizel Penza || 1–3 || 2–3
|-

Team at the time of crash
Remembered 7 September 2011.

|}

Staff

 Zyuzyakin and Valtonen were the only club members not aboard the plane.

References

External links
 Official Website

Yaro
2011–12 in Russian ice hockey
Lokomotiv Yaroslavl seasons